Veena Nandakumar is an Indian actress who appears in Malayalam movies. She started her cinematic  career in 2017 in a Malayalam film Kadamkatha and then a Tamil film, but her notable debut was with the Malayalam movie Kettyolaanu Ente Malakha.

Career
Veena Nandakumar made her movie debut through 2017 Malayalam film Kadamkatha directed by Senthil Raj. But she didn't get much attention as the film was a box office failure. She debuted in Tamil language films through Thodraa, in which she played Divya, a girl from a rich family who fell in love and eloped with a low-caste man. Anupama Subramanian of Deccan Chronicle rated her performanceas "decent". 

She got her breakthrough role in 2019 Malayalam-language romantic drama film Kettyolaanu Ente Malakha were she played Rincy, "a very restrained" character according to Veena. Anna Mathews of Times of India wrote that the character was "played with just the right amount of restraint" by her. 

In 2020, she played supporting roles as Annie in Family Drama film Kozhipporu and Haritha in black comedy psychological thriller film Love. Reviewing Kozhipporu for Times of India, Deepa Soman wrote that she "performed well within the limited scope of the tale".

Filmography

References

External links

Living people
Actresses in Malayalam cinema
1990 births